LisaGay Hamilton is an American actress who has portrayed roles in films, television, and on stage. She is best known for her role as secretary/lawyer Rebecca Washington on the ABC legal drama The Practice (1997–2003). She also portrayed Melissa Thoreau on the TNT comedy-drama Men of a Certain Age (2009-2011), Celia Jones on the Netflix series House of Cards (2016), Suzanne Simms on the Hulu series Chance (2016), and Kayla Price on the Hulu series The First (2018).

Hamilton's film credits include roles in 12 Monkeys (1995), Jackie Brown (1997), Beloved (1998), True Crime (1999), The Sum of All Fears (2002), The Soloist (2009), Beastly (2011), Beautiful Boy (2018), and Vice (2018). Her theater credits include Measure for Measure (Isabella), Henry IV Parts I & II (Lady Hotspur), Athol Fugard's, Valley Song and The Ohio State Murders. Hamilton was also an original cast member in the Broadway productions of August Wilson’s The Piano Lesson and Gem of the Ocean. In 2005 she won a Peabody Award for creating and directing the 2003 documentary film Beah: A Black Woman Speaks.

Early life
Hamilton was born in Los Angeles, California but spent most of her childhood in Stony Brook, New York on Long Island.  Her father, Ira Winslow Hamilton, Jr., hailed from Bessemer, Alabama, and her mother, the former Eleanor Albertine "Tina" Blackwell, was from Meridian, Mississippi. Both parents graduated from historically black colleges—Tina attended Talladega while Ira went to Morehouse—and they both became successful professionals. Ira worked for a while as an engineer and then went into business as a general contractor. Tina eventually earned a master's degree in social work and worked for the Girl Scouts for many years.

Hamilton fell in love with theater at an early age. During the 1970s, she saw several off-Broadway productions by the Negro Ensemble Company, including A Soldier's Story and The First Breeze of Summer. She enrolled in Carnegie Mellon University to study theater, but after a year was accepted into New York University's Tisch Drama School where she earned a Bachelor of Fine Arts in Theater in 1985. She then pursued graduate studies at The Juilliard School where she earned a M.A. in drama in 1989.

Career
Early on, Hamilton set her sights on classical theater. In one of her first notable roles, she played opposite Kevin Kline in Measure for Measure in the New York Shakespeare Festival. Hamilton's performances in Much Ado About Nothing, Tartuffe, Reckless, Family of Mann, and Two Gentlemen of Verona, earned her a reputation as a serious dramatic actor. In 1995–96, her portrayal of a young, aspiring South African singer in Athol Fugard's Valley Song garnered an Obie Award, the Clarence Derwent Award, the Ovation nomination for best actress, and a Drama Desk nomination. More recently, Hamilton earned critical acclaim, her second Obie, and a Lucille Lortel Award nomination for her role as Suzanne Alexander in Adrienne Kennedy's, The Ohio State Murders.

Hamilton appeared in over two dozen films, including The Truth About Charlie and Beloved for director Jonathan Demme, Clint Eastwood's True Crime, the independent films; Palookaville, Drunks, Showtime's A House Divided, and as Ophelia in director Campbell Scott's film version of Hamlet. She has worked on several projects with director Rodrigo García, notably his films Ten Tiny Love Stories, Nine Lives, and Mother and Child. Honeydripper directed by John Sayles and The Soloist, directed by Joe Wright.

Hamilton won a Peabody Award in 2005 for creating and directing the 2003 documentary film Beah: A Black Woman Speaks. The film tells the story of pioneering black actress Beah Richards, who had broken ground for African-American actresses. The two women had met on the set of Beloved (1998).  Over the next two years, Hamilton made a record of more than 70 hours of their conversations. Hamilton's film explored Richards' political activism as well as her poetry. The film won the Grand Jury Prize at the AFI Film Festival. After Richards died in 2000, Hamilton collaborated with illustrator R. Gregory Christie to turn one of her poems into a children's book. Keep Climbing Girls was published by Simon and Schuster in 2006.

Hamilton played the role of Melissa in Men of a Certain Age, an hour-long comedy-drama television series starring Ray Romano, Andre Braugher, and Scott Bakula that ran from 2009 to 2011.

In the fall of 2010, Hamilton took a faculty position in the School of Theater for the California Institute of the Arts.

Filmography

Film and TV Movies

Television

Stage

Awards and nominations

References

External links
 
 

Actresses from Los Angeles
Clarence Derwent Award winners
Juilliard School alumni
Living people
Tisch School of the Arts alumni
Carnegie Mellon University College of Fine Arts alumni
Obie Award recipients
African-American actresses
American television actresses
American film actresses
American stage actresses
American Shakespearean actresses
20th-century American actresses
21st-century American actresses
Peabody Award winners
Year of birth missing (living people)